Eupeodes lundbecki  is a Palearctic hoverfly.

Description
It resembles other Eupeodes.  Determination is problematic.  Key references are Haarto, A. & Kerppola, S. (2007) and Bartsch, H., Binkiewicz, E., Rådén, A. & Nasibov, E. (2009). and Torp (1994).

Distribution and biology

Iceland, Finland and Denmark south to the Netherlands, from France eastwards through Germany, Poland and Russia into Siberia and Mongolia and through the Russian Far East to the Pacific. Large-scale movements of this species occurs out of Scandinavia in late summer.  It is found in the taiga in Abies, Picea, and Pinus forest from May to October. The larvae probably feed on conifer aphids.

References

External links
 Images representing Eupeodes lundbecki

Diptera of Europe
Syrphini
Insects described in 1946